The 2021 FIM Endurance World Championship (FIM EWC) was the 42nd season of the FIM Endurance World Championship, a motorcycle racing series co-organised by the Fédération Internationale de Motocyclisme (FIM) and Eurosport Events.

Calendar
The 2021 championship was scheduled to consists of 5 races in Europe and Asia.
The calendar was released on 29 December 2020. On 17 March 2021; the calendar was updated and the races of 12 Hours of Estoril and Suzuka 8 Hours swapped their places in response to the COVID-19 pandemic. Therefore, the season began on the 17 April with the 24 Hours Moto in France, and was scheduled to end on the 7 November with the Suzuka 8 Hours in Japan.

Calendar Changes
After being cancelled due to the COVID-19 pandemic, the 8 Hours of Oschersleben, Suzuka 8 Hours and the Bol d'Or all returned to the calendar.
The 8 Hours of Sepang was dropped from the calendar.
On 17 March 2021; 12 Hours of Estoril and Suzuka 8 Hours swapped their places in response to the COVID-19 pandemic. The Suzuka 8 Hours was later cancelled.
Also due to COVID-19, 24 Hours Moto and 8 Hours of Oschersleben were first delayed.
The race at Autodrom Most was then added following the cancellation of the Oschersleben and Suzuka eight-hour races. Originally an eight-hour race, the event, part of the FIA WTCC Race of the Czech Republic (which is also promoted by Eurosport) schedule, it was reduced to six hours because of restrictions at the event.

==Teams and riders==

FIM EWC Teams

Results and Standings

Race Results

Championship standings
Points systems

 According to FIM regulations, the points allocated for the final round was promoted by 150%.

 The Top 10 teams after 8h and 16h of race received bonus points.

 In each race, the top 5 teams on starting grid received bonus points.

FIM EWC World Championship Team Rankings

FIM EWC World Championship Manufacturer's Rankings

Notes

References

External links

2021
2021 in motorcycle sport